Priestly is a surname. Notable people with the surname include:
 Miranda Priestly, a character in The Devil Wears Prada
 Paul Priestly, a character in EastEnders

See also
 Priestley (disambiguation)
 Priestly source, one of the proposed sources of the Torah/Pentateuch according to the documentary hypothesis
 Priest, a religious leader authorized to perform sacred rituals and mediate between humans and deities